Qezlijeh may refer to:
 Qezlijeh, Hamadan
 Qezlijeh, Markazi